Nahom Girmai Netabay (born 28 August 1994) is a Swedish football midfielder who plays for Kalmar.

Club career
On 5 December 2021, Girmai signed with Kalmar for the 2022 season.

Personal life
Born in Sweden, Girmai is of Eritrean descent.

References

1994 births
Living people
Swedish footballers
Swedish people of Eritrean descent
Swedish sportspeople of African descent
Association football midfielders
Kristianstad FC players
Varbergs BoIS players
IK Sirius Fotboll players
Kalmar FF players
Allsvenskan players
Superettan players